Pritam Kotal (born 8 September 1993) is an Indian professional footballer who plays as a defender for Indian Super League club ATK Mohun Bagan, which he captains and the India national team.

Club career

Early career and Indian Arrows
Born in Uttarpara, West Bengal, Kotal began playing football at the age of four after being inspired by his uncle, who was also a footballer. He then began his youth career with Chirag United before playing for the West Bengal youth team. Kotal also played for Wari in 2009.

After spending time with the India under-19 side, Kotal joined the All India Football Federation's development I-League side, Pailan Arrows (current Indian Arrows). He played in six matches during his debut 2011–12 season for the side.

Mohun Bagan
After Pailan Arrows disbanded and before the 2013–14 season, Kotal signed with Mohun Bagan. He made his debut for the club on 23 October 2013 against Salgaocar. He came on as an 85th-minute substitute for Aiborlang Khongjee as Mohun Bagan won 2–1. Kotal scored his first goal for the club on 7 February 2015 against Pune. His 77th-minute goal was the only one in a 1–0 victory for Mohun Bagan. He scored his second goal of his career, and second of the season on 20 May against Royal Wahingdoh. His goal was the first of two as Mohun Bagan won 2–0. As well as by providing two goals, Kotal also helped Mohun Bagan to win their first ever I-League title, and thus Mohun Bagan became the first side from Kolkata to win the title, since the inception of league in 2007. Kotal played the 2015-16 I-League campaign, and played his first match of the season against Aizawl on 9 January 2016.  Kotal scored an own goal in that match, thereby Aizawl getting an equalizer. But after the final whistle, Mohun Bagan went on to win the match 3–1. Kotal played his first continental match on 27 January, when he played the East zone preliminary round 1 match of the 2016 AFC Champions League's qualifying play-off match against Tampines Rovers FC on 27 January 2016, which they won 3–1 after final whistle. Mohun Bagan after was redirected to 2016 AFC Cup, when they failed to make it to the group stages of the 2016 AFC Champions League. Kotal played his first AFC Cup match against South China AA on 9 March, where they won the match on a big margin of 0–4. Kotal later that season left the club on loan for his second spell at FC Pune City, and from there, he went on to play for Atletico de Kolkata in the 2016 ISL season. He returned to the club after winning the 2016 Indian Super League title with Atlético de Kolkata for the 2016-17 I-League season in early 2017. He scored his first goal for the club that season against Mumbai FC on 8 March 2017, where he opened the scored sheet in the 12th minute of the match, which concluded in a 2–2 draw after the final whistle. Kotal played his last match for the club against Chennai City FC on 30 April, which ended 2–1 with Mohun Bagan taking the three points of the match. Kotal then left the club to join Delhi Dynamos on a permanent deal.

Pune City (loan spells)
In July 2014, it was announced that Kotal would be among 84 Indian players who would be a part of the 2014 ISL Inaugural Domestic Draft, being available on loan from Mohun Bagan. On 22 July 2014, he was drafted in the fifth round of the draft by Pune City. He made his debut for the club in the Indian Super League on 18 October against Mumbai City FC. Despite starting the match, Pune City lost the match against their Maharashtra rivals 5–0. After his first season at the club, Kotal said that the experience of playing in the Indian Super League really helped him, that he played as a left back for all the games he played, and playing with the former Inter Milan defender Bruno Cirillo really helped him to improve his style of play.

Kotal returned to Pune City for the 2015 season, but he played only two matches in that season.

Atlético de Kolkata (loan)
On 14 June 2016 it was announced that Kotal had signed with Atlético de Kolkata (later ATK) on loan for the 2016 Indian Super League season. He made his debut for the side on 2 October against Chennaiyin FC. Kotal started in the match and played the whole 90 minutes, as Atlético de Kolkata drew 2–2. Kolkata had a breakthrough season as they went on to qualify for the knockout stages of the season. Kolkata faced Mumbai City in the semi finals, and progressed through to the final on an aggregate score of 3–2 from both legs. During the second leg of the semi final against Mumbai on 13 December, Kotal was involved in a brawl that broke after the final whistle of the game. He said that he was mildly injured during the scuffle, and felt a sensation of blindness. He later confirmed that he was fine. Kolkata then went on to face Kerala Blasters FC in the final match of the season, which they won 4–3 on penalty shootout, after the match drew 1–1 after the full time and extra time. Kotal thus won his maiden ISL title, and Atlético de Kolkata was emerged as the champions for the second time in their history.

Delhi Dynamos 
Kotal joined Indian Super League side Delhi Dynamos FC (current Odisha FC) for the 2017-18 season. He played his debut match for the club against FC Pune City on 22 November 2017, which ended in a 2–3 victory for Delhi. He scored his debut goal for the club against Kerala Blasters on 10 January 2018, where Kotal scored the equalizer in the 44th minute, but the match turned out to be a defeat, after Kerala scored two more goals, resulting in a 1–3 defeat for Delhi. He stayed at the club for the 2018-19 season and he was given captain's armband for his impressive 2017-18 campaign. He played his first match of the season against Pune City on 3 October 2018 in a 1–1 draw. Kotal scored his first goal of the season against his former club ATK on 17 October, which ended in a 1–2 loss for Delhi. He played his last match for Delhi Dynamos on 3 March 2019 in the return match against ATK, which again ended in a 2–1 defeat for Delhi. Kotal stayed two seasons at Delhi Dynamos, and left the club to return to ATK in January transfer window.

Return to ATK 
In the late 2018, it was being reported, and later confirmed that Kotal would be returning to ATK after the 2019 AFC Asian Cup in the January transfer window. He played his remaining 2018-19 campaign with ATK, and played his first match with ATK that season against Kerala Blasters on 25 January 2019, which ended in a 1–1 draw. Kotal played his first match in a regular season after returning to ATK in the 2019-20 Indian Super League season against Kerala Blasters in the opening match of the season on 20 October, which they eventually lost 2–1 after taking the lead in the beginning of the match. He scored his debut goal for ATK and first of this season against FC Goa on 18 January 2020, where he opened the score sheet in the 47th minute of the match, which ended 2–0 victory for ATK. ATK qualified for the knockout stages of the 2019–20 season, and progressed through to final after defeating Bengaluru FC in an aggregate score of 3–2 from both legs to face Chennaiyin FC in the final. Kotal played the final that took place in Fatorda Stadium in Goa, where they emerged victorious after defeating Chennaiyin 3–1 in the final whistle. Kotal thus won his second ISL title, and ATK won the trophy for a record third time.

ATK Mohun Bagan 
After ATK merged with his former club Mohun Bagan, the new merged brand came to be called ATK Mohun Bagan FC, who would play in the Indian Super League from the 2020-21 season. Kotal was signed by the squad, and was named one of the 5 captains for the season by the coach Antonio Habas. He played his debut match for ATK Mohun Bagan in ISL against Kerala Blasters in the opening match of the season on 20 October 2020, which they won 0–1 at GMC Athletic Stadium, Goa. Kotal scored his debut goal for the club against Hyderabad FC in a 2–2 draw on 22 February 2021, where he scored in the injury time, thereby equalising the game for ATK Mohun Bagan. ATK Mohun Bagan qualified for the Indian Super League final in their maiden season after defeating NorthEast United FC on an aggregate score of 3–2 in the semi finals from both legs. Kotal played in the final against Mumbai City on 13 March, which were defeated by a 2–1 score after Mumbai City scored a last minute goal. For the next season he continued as one of the captains of the club.

International career

Kotal first began his international career for India at the under-19 level. After successfully going through a trial, Kotal was selected into the squad that went on an exposure trip to China before playing for the side during the 2012 AFC U-19 Championship qualifiers which India failed to make. He then played for the under-22 side during the 2013 AFC U-22 Championship qualifiers in Oman. He was then part of the under-23 side to participate at the 2014 Asian Games in South Korea. Kotal's participation with the under-23 side continued further, as he was a part of the 2015's India's squad that took part in the 2016 AFC U-23 Championship qualifiers in Bangladesh.

After his impressive performances at club level, Kotal made it to the senior national squad of India, and made his international debut on 12 March 2015 in their 2018 FIFA World Cup qualifying match against Nepal. The match was also Stephen Constantine's first match as the head coach for India. He played the full match but earned a sixth minute yellow card as India won 2–0. Nine months later, on 3 January 2016, Kotal helped India clinch the SAFF Championship, when they defeated the reigning champions Afghanistan 2–1 in extra-time. Kotal started the match and played the entire match for India. He was called up for the squad of India, that took part in the 2018 Intercontinental Cup. He started in the final against Kenya on 10 August 2018, which India won 2–0. Kotal was later called up for India's squad for the 2019 King's Cup.

India qualified for the 2019 AFC Asian Cup after missing out of the 2015's edition. Kotal played five matches in the qualifiers for India in the 2019 AFC Asian Cup. Kotal was included in the 23-member squad of India to travel to UAE. He played his debut match in any edition AFC Asian Cup, and also his first of the 2019 edition on 6 January 2019, where India outplayed Thailand, and defeated them with an humongous score of 1–4. It was also India's first victory in an AFC Asian Cup match in 55 years, and was also their biggest win in Asian Cup history. Kotal played all three matches in their group stage including the do-or-die match against Bahrain on 14 January, which India lost 0–1, resulting in the elimination of India from the campaign.

Style of play
Kotal is a versatile right back who is capable of playing any role in the defensive area.

Personal life 
Kotal's date of birth is contentious with many different dates being reported but he is believed to have been born in the Uttarpara, West Bengal on 8 September 1993. His dad was a rickshaw puller, and his uncle played football, who introduced him to playing football. Kotal idolise former Indian international Deepak Mondal, who used to play as a right back during his playing time. In 2020, Kotal launched an academy to provide training and practice to the underprivileged young footballers. In March 2020, he donated Indian rupees 50,000 to the West Bengal Chief Minister's fund for the COVID-19 pandemic.

Kotal has been in a relationship with Bengali sports-reporter Sonela Paul.

Career statistics

Club

International

Honours

Club
Mohun Bagan
I-League: 2014–15
Federation Cup: 2015–16

ATK
Indian Super League: 2016, 2019–20

ATK Mohun Bagan F.C.
Indian Super League
Championship Runners-up: 2020–21
 Premiership Runners-up: 2020–21

International
India
SAFF Championship: 2015, 2021
Intercontinental Cup: 2017, 2018
King's Cup third place: 2019

India U23
 South Asian Games Silver medal: 2016

Individual 

 AIFF Emerging Player of the Year: 2015

References

External links 
 
Pritam Kotal at Indian Super League
Pritam Kotal at All India Football Federation

1993 births
Living people
People from Uttarpara
Indian footballers
Indian Arrows players
Mohun Bagan AC players
FC Pune City players
ATK (football club) players
Association football defenders
Footballers from Kolkata
I-League players
Calcutta Football League players
Indian Super League players
India international footballers
India youth international footballers
Footballers at the 2014 Asian Games
2019 AFC Asian Cup players
Asian Games competitors for India
Odisha FC players
ATK Mohun Bagan FC players
South Asian Games silver medalists for India
South Asian Games medalists in football